Baroda Cricket Association is the governing body of the Cricket activities in the Baroda region in the Gujarat state of India and the Baroda cricket team. It is affiliated to the Board of Control for Cricket in India.

Many past and present India national cricket team players, such as Nayan Mongia, Zaheer Khan, and Irfan Pathan played at some point for Baroda.

History

Cricket was introduced to Vadodara city by Maharaja of Baroda Sayajirao Gaekwad in 1934 and Moti Bagh Stadium was the home of the Baroda cricket. Since then Baroda has emerged as Ranji Trophy Champions in the year 1942-43,1946–47,1949–50,1957-58 and 2000-01.

Maharaja Fatehsinghrao Gaekwad was President of BCCI from 1963 to 1965 & had gone to England as a Manager of Indian Team in the year 1952 & later was sent to Pakistan as a Manager to create good-will between the two countries & played an important role in establishing good relations.

Baroda had produced many cricketers of international level in the past such as Vijay Hazare, Gogumal Kishenchand, Jayasinghrao Ghorpade, Deepak Shodhan & in the present generation Datta Gaekwad, Chandu Borde, Kiran More, Anshuman Gaekwad, Nayan Mongia, Jitendra Patel.

Currently, Irfan Pathan, Yusuf Pathan, and Zaheer Khan . There are also young players like Pinal Shah, Ajitesh Argal who are knocking the doors of International Cricket.

In January 2015, Memorandum of Understanding was signed between Government of Gujarat and Baroda Cricket Association for the stadium and will be located at Kotambi on the outskirts of Vadodara with the cost of Rs. 100 crores to develop 29 acres of land.

In January 2016, Memorandum of Understanding was signed between Reliance Industries Ltd and Baroda Cricket Association for leasing Reliance Stadium which will be renovated will have a capacity of 40,000 spectators as well as include facilities like floodlights, dressing room, swimming pool, gymnasium and other cricketing facilities. The ground will also be renamed after Dhirubhai Ambani as Dhirubhai Ambani Cricket Stadium.

Tournament

 Maharani Shantadevi Coca-Cola Cup Inter School Under-16s Tournament
 Capt Vijay Hazare Under-16 Three-Day Tournament
 Baroda Under-16 Invitation Tournament
 Jaisinghrao Surve Under-19 One-Day Tournament
 Late Mamasaheb Ghorpade Under-19 Three-Day Tournament
 HH Maharaja Fatehsinghrao Gaekwad Two Day Tournament
 HD Zaveri Three Day Premier League
 Late Jaywant Lele Under-19 one-day all India Invitation Tournament

Home ground

 Moti Bagh Stadium - Hosted three ODIs and now mostly used for Ranji Trophy matches
 Reliance Stadium - Hosted 10 ODIs since 1994 to 2010
 Vadodara International Cricket Stadium - Under construction

International Umpire

 Sanjay Hazare

References

External links 

Cricket administration in India
Sport in Vadodara
Cricket in Gujarat
Sports organizations established in 1937
1937 establishments in India